The name Bogd Uul can refer to a number of different mountains and mountain ranges, including:

In Mongolia
Bogd Khan Uul near Ulaanbaatar

In China
Bogda Shan in Xinjiang